Josef Reicha (Rejcha) (12 February 1752 – 5 March 1795) was a Czech cellist, composer and conductor. He was the uncle of composer and music theorist Anton Reicha.

Josef Reicha was born in Chudenice. In 1761 he moved to Prague, where he was taught cello by Franz Joseph Werner. In 1771 Reicha became first cellist in the Kapelle of Prince (Fürst) Kraft Ernst von Oettingen-Wallerstein. Together with the famous violinist Anton Janitsch, who also played in the Kapelle, Reicha toured several European cities during the late 1770s and visited Leopold Mozart in Salzburg in 1778. In his letters to Wolfgang Amadeus, Leopold praised Reicha's cello playing and compared the style of one of his cello concerts to those by Wolfgang Amadeus.

Reicha adopted his nephew Anton in 1780 (Josef married in 1779, but the marriage produced no children) and subsequently taught him the violin and the piano. In 1785 Josef was made director of the orchestra in Bonn by Maximilian Francis of Austria, Elector of Cologne; the whole family moved to Bonn. Anton became a member of the Hofkapelle through his uncle. Other members included the young Beethoven, who played the viola and the organ, and Nikolaus Simrock, founder of the Simrock music publishing firm, who played the horn in the orchestra. Simrock would later publish Josef's works. In 1789 Josef became music director of the new theater, Bonner Nationaltheater. Unfortunately, his musical career was cut short in 1791, when he contracted gout. He died four years later in Bonn.

Style 
Reicha wrote music for orchestra and chamber ensembles of different kinds. His works include symphonies, various concertos including eleven for cello, twelve partitas for wind instruments and miscellaneous other works. Most of Reicha's compositions were completed in Wallerstein, before his Bonn years. His writing for strings and cello particularly is markedly virtuosic, reflecting his own skill. Music scholar Ludwig Schiedermair in 'Der junge Beethoven' (Leipzig, 1925) gave specific examples taken from Reicha's partitas and symphonies and has proven that these works influenced Beethoven. Other important admirers of Reicha included Leopold Mozart and Michael Haydn.

Notes

References 
 Claus Reinländer. "Reicha, Josef", Grove Music Online, ed. L. Macy, grovemusic.com (subscription access).

External links
 

1752 births
1795 deaths
Czech Classical-period composers
Czech male classical composers
18th-century classical composers
18th-century male musicians
People from Klatovy District